Gao Wei-jie (born on 24 June 1997) is a Taiwanese professional footballer who plays as a midfielder for the Chinese Taipei national team.

He debuted internationally on 3 June 2021 in a World Cup qualifying match against Nepal in a 2–0 defeat.

On 7 June 2021, Gao scored his first goal for Chinese Taipei against Australia in a 5–1 defeat.

Statistics

International goals

References

External links
 
 

1997 births
Living people
Taiwanese footballers
Chinese Taipei international footballers
Association football midfielders